The Chala or "Coast" is one of the eight natural regions in Peru. It is formed by all the western lands that arise from sea level up to the height of 500 meters.

In this region, the flora includes vegetation that grows near the rivers, like the carob tree, the palo verde, salty grama grass, manglar or mangrove tree, the carrizo or giant reed and the Caña brava (ditch reed); and plants that grow in the hills, such as the Amancay or Peruvian daffodil (Hymenocallis amancaes), the wild tomato, the mito or Peruvian papaya (Vasconcellea candicans), and the divi-divi (Cæsalpinia coriaria).

The coastal fauna of the Chala includes sea lions, the anchovy and several seabirds.

Common trees in the north are the faique, the zapote, the zapayal, the barrigon and other thorny tropical savanna trees of the equatorial dry forests on the northern coast of Piura and Tumbes. Páramo and the northern coast of the Piura region are not under the influence of the cold Humboldt Current. Páramo has a tree line at the border, even on the westside of the continental divide.

Overview 
Andean Continental Divide
 

Mountain top:

 Mountain passes - 4,100 m  
 Puna grassland  
 Andean-alpine desert  
 Snow line - about 5,000 m  
 Janca - rocks, snow and ice     
 Peak

Loma-vegetation

This subregion has a subtropical desert climate with little rainfall along the central and southern coast (drier as one goes south).

Orientation:
 Lomas, fog and mist-fed ecosystems on hills near the ocean and scattered along the nearly-rainless coastal desert.  
 Lomas de Lachay, Huaral Province in Lima, a protected example of a mist-fed ecosystem.

See also

 Climate zones by altitude
 Altitudinal zonation

Literature 

Physiographic regions of Peru